William Rinehart may refer to:

 William Henry Rinehart (1825–1874), American sculptor
 William V. Rinehart (1835–1918), American army officer
 William A. Rinehart (1846–1922), American politician

See also 

 Rinehart (disambiguation)